BergamoScienza is a science festival held annually in Bergamo, Italy. Established in 2003, its purpose is to promote the popularization of science.  The festival consists of lectures, exhibitions, interactive workshops, as well as meetings with scientists. The event BergamoScienza is organized by the Non-profit organization BergamoScienza, whose founders were a group of friends. 24 Nobel Prize laureates have participated to BergamoScienza since 2003, among them John F. Nash, Kari Mullis, Paul Crutzen, Roald Hoffman, Peter Agre,  Aaron Ciechanover, Martin Chalfie, Eric Kandel, Barry Marshall, R. Timothy Hunt, Linda Buck, Bruce Beutler, James Dewey Watson. Among innovative personalities, Jimmy Wales Wikipedia founder attended the conference. 

In 2004, there were over 35,000 attendees; by 2008, over 72,000 people attended the festival; in the 2011 edition, 112 500. There has never been any charge for admission.

Notable past presenters include Burt Rutan (2004), Marvin Minsky (2006), and Luciano Maiani (2008). The 2009 festival included a presentation regarding Wikipedia, as well as the exhibition "From the Moon to the Earth", organized by the Museo di Scienze Naturali Enrico Caffi.

References

Recurring events established in 2003
Festivals in Italy
Science festivals
Culture in Bergamo
2003 establishments in Italy
Tourist attractions in Lombardy
Science events in Italy